The Funival is a  gauge funicular railway in Val-d'Isère, France

The Funival starts above ground in La Daille and after a few hundred meters it enters a tunnel ending at the mountain station on top of the Bellevarde.
The Funival uses two trains, connected by cables, on a single track. Halfway, a short section of dual track (passing loop) allows the trains to pass each other.

Description
The remaining . runs through a drilled tunnel. Halfway a section of double track allows the climbing train to pass the downward train.
A cable runs from the front of the lower train, via a construction of electric powered pulleys in the mountain station to the back of the descending train.
The mass of the descending train helps pull the climbing train and electric motors provide the power to overcome the weight difference between the climbing and descending trains plus any friction.

During most runs the climbing train will be far heavier than the descending train as the main function of the Funival is to take skiers to the top of the mountain. If the descending train is heavier than the climbing (when more passengers travel down than up) the electric motors can work as brakes. Each train is also provided with mechanical brakes to act as emergency brakes if the main cable should break.
Although the Funival runs summer and winter it was primarily built to bring skiers to the top of the mountain.

Technical details

See also 
 List of funicular railways

References

External links 

 Photos of the Funival system and the track and cars (in French)

Funival
Ski lifts
1200 mm gauge railways in France